Al Thompson and Son's Feed and Seed Company, also known as Tobler's Feed and Fuel or Farmers Feed and Seed and currently used as the Oregon Trail Agriculture Museum, is a building located in Nyssa, Oregon in the United States, listed on the National Register of Historic Places.

See also
 National Register of Historic Places listings in Malheur County, Oregon

References

External links
 Oregon Trail Agriculture Museum - Travel Oregon

1938 establishments in Oregon
Agriculture museums in the United States
Museums established in 1938
History museums in Oregon
Museums in Malheur County, Oregon
National Register of Historic Places in Malheur County, Oregon
Nyssa, Oregon
1930s architecture in the United States